Chaplain (Brigadier General) George Foreman Rixey, USA (March 2, 1888 – May 13, 1974) was an American Army officer who served as the 1st Deputy Chief of Chaplains of the United States Army from 1942–1945.

Biography 
Rixey served as a line officer in World War I in France as a First Lieutenant, and then accepted a commission as a military chaplain. On returning to the United States after the war, he served in a variety of different locations, and was later promoted to Major in 1931.

He was awarded the rank of Brigadier General at the end of World War II, which established that as the grade for the office. After the war he was moved to the Office of the Inspector General where he served until his retirement. General Rixey, his wife Leslie Young (1880–1976) and their son George Jr. (1911–1914) are buried at Arlington National Cemetery, section 2, grave E-280.

Quotes 
Regarding the duties of army chaplains:"To the chaplain comes the extraordinary privilege of interpreting to those potential potential saviors of our nation how the high qualities of citizenship and social morality may be transmitted into military value and effective military action."

References

External links
Generals of World War II

 
 
 
 
 

1888 births
1974 deaths
United States Army generals
Deputy Chiefs of Chaplains of the United States Army
Burials at Arlington National Cemetery
United States Army personnel of World War I
United States Army generals of World War II